Abdiwahid Elmi Gonjeh, popularly known as Abdiwahid Gonjeh, is a Somali politician. He is currently a Senator of upper house of the Federal Parliament representing Galgaduud region , Abudwak District. From September through October 2010, he was the acting Prime Minister of Somalia, a post he inherited from Omar Abdirashid Ali Sharmarke. Prior to his appointment, Gonjeh had been the Deputy Prime Minister and federal Minister for Transport.

He hails from the Darod Marehan subclan. In mid-2012, Gonjeh presented himself as a candidate in Somalia's 2012 presidential elections.

References

Member of federal parliament of Somalia both lower house and upper house from 2002 up to date April 2019.

Living people
21st-century prime ministers of Somalia
Prime Ministers of Somalia
Somalian Muslims
Year of birth missing (living people)